Die You Zombie Bastards! is a 2005 American comedy horror film directed by Caleb Emerson, written by Emerson and Haig Demarjian, and starring Tim Gerstmar, Geoff Mosher, and Pippi Zornoza.  It is about a serial killer (Gerstmar) who must save his cannibal wife Violet (Zornoza) from zombies animated by Baron Nefarious (Mosher).

Plot 
Serial killer Red Toole is married to Violet.  After a night of killing innocent people, Red comes home to find that Violet has given him a gift: a superhero outfit made out of human skin.  Red's joy is cut short when Baron Nefarious kidnaps Violet.  Red puts on his superhero outfit and sets off to rescue his wife before she is turned into a mindless zombie.

Cast 
 Tim Gerstmar as Red / Coconut Head Face Man / Mother Nefarious / Thierry Toole
 Geoff Mosher as Baron Nefarious
 Pippi Zornoza as Violet
 Jamie Gillis as Stavros
 Hasil Adkins as himself

Production 
The film was shot in Providence, Rhode Island.  Production began while Emerson was still in film school and continued after his graduation.

Release 
Notable Film Festival screenings include:
 Lausanne Underground Film Festival 2005 (Winner: Best Feature Film)
 Fantasia (Montreal) 2006
 Backseat Film Festival 2006 (Winner: Best Feature Film, Best Title)
 Weekend of Fear (Erlangen, DE)
 Sci-Fi-London 2006
 Rhode Island Horror Film Festival 2006 (Winner: Best Feature Film)
 Tromanale (Berlin) 2005 (Winner: Best Feature Film, Best Screenplay, Best Actor (Tim Gerstmar))

The film was released on DVD on January 16, 2007.

Reception 
Bill Gibron of Pop Matters wrote that the film "is so expertly realized, so perfectly set within its own insular world that it's not long before you forget all the movie type muck-ups and simply enjoy the entertainment being offered."  Bloody Disgusting rated the film 4/5 stars and wrote, "I for one have never been so shocked, disgusted, and strangely turned on by a film in all my life."  Steve Barton of Dread Central rated it 3/5 stars and called it an absurd film similar to Troma's golden age of gratuitous violence and nudity.  Michael Ferraro of Film Threat rated it 2.5/5 stars and called it an unfocused film similar to a sub-par Troma release.  David Cornelius of DVD Talk rated it 1/5 stars and called it a Troma-inspired film that is an unwatchable mess.  Writing in Zombie Movies: The Ultimate Guide, Glenn Kay called it "a rotten lowball effort" whose gags are "juvenile and tasteless".  Peter Dendle, who wrote The Zombie Movie Encyclopedia, Volume 2, called it "ultra-camp shlock in the Troma tradition".

References

External links 
 
 

2005 films
2005 horror films
2000s comedy horror films
American independent films
American comedy horror films
Films about cannibalism
Parodies of horror
American serial killer films
American zombie comedy films
Films shot in Rhode Island
American superhero films
Superhero horror films
2005 comedy films
American exploitation films
American splatter films
American black comedy films
2000s English-language films
2000s American films